The 1989–90 Greek Football Cup was the 48th edition of the Greek Football Cup.

Tournament details

Totally 76 teams participated, 18 from Alpha Ethniki, 18 from Beta, and 40 from Gamma. It was held in 6 rounds, included final.

It was a very interesting competition, that was characterized by undecided confrontations and enough surprises, from which the mainer was the elimination of AEK Athens by neophyte in Alpha Ethniki Ionikos, in Round of 32. At the same time, PAOK eliminated Sparti on penalty shootout. PAOK's goalkeeper, Gitsioudis, warded off all 4 shots of rival players). Iraklis eliminated Ilisiakos after extra time, with away goals rule.

In the Third Round, PAOK was eliminated on penalties by Olympiacos, after two eventful matches, while in quarter-finals there were impressive qualifications of both Panathinaikos, against Iraklis (6–1 at first leg), and OFI, against Athinaikos, that reversed 5–0 the first leg's 0–3. In two very interesting semi-finals, Olympiacos eliminated Panathinaikos after extra time, while OFI qualified against Apollon Athens with a goal in last minutes of the second leg.

In the Final, Olympiacos overcame 4–2 OFI and won the Cup after 9 years. For the Cretan team, it was the second and last time until present that they achieved to qualify for a Greek Cup Final. Top scorers of the season were Lajos Détári and Dimitris Saravakos, with 8 goals each.

Calendar

Group stage

The phase was played in a single round-robin format. Each win would gain 2 points, each draw 1 and each loss would not gain any point.

Group 1

Group 2

Group 3

Group 4

Group 5

Group 6

Group 7

Group 8

Group 9

Group 10

Group 11

Group 12

Group 13

Group 14

Group 15

Group 16

Knockout phase
Each tie in the knockout phase, apart from the final, was played over two legs, with each team playing one leg at home. The team that scored more goals on aggregate over the two legs advanced to the next round. If the aggregate score was level, the away goals rule was applied, i.e. the team that scored more goals away from home over the two legs advanced. If away goals were also equal, then extra time was played. The away goals rule was again applied after extra time, i.e. if there were goals scored during extra time and the aggregate score was still level, the visiting team advanced by virtue of more away goals scored. If no goals were scored during extra time, the winners were decided by a penalty shoot-out. In the final, which were played as a single match, if the score was level at the end of normal time, extra time was played, followed by a penalty shoot-out if the score was still level.The mechanism of the draws for each round is as follows:
There are no seedings, and teams from the same group can be drawn against each other.

Bracket

Round of 32

|}

Round of 16

|}

Quarter-finals

|}

Semi-finals

|}

Final

The 46th Greek Cup Final was played at the Olympic Stadium.

References

External links
Greek Cup 1989-90 at RSSSF

Greek Football Cup seasons
Greek Cup
Cup